The Elks Building in Stockton, California is a 5-story U-shaped Chicago style/Commercial Style building built during 1906–08.  Located at the corner of Sutter and Weber Streets, it has a copper cornice over those two streets.

It is unusual, structurally, due to reports from the 1906 San Francisco earthquake about which types of buildings survived earthquake and fire.  Ergo it is built from steel and concrete on the first two floors, although from there up has timber framing with two-foot thick brick masonry exterior walls.  A March 1906 newspaper report had stated the building was expected to be built from brick masonry; a May 1906 newspaper report said its construction would change.

It was listed on the National Register of Historic Places in 1980.

References

Elks buildings
Clubhouses on the National Register of Historic Places in California
Buildings and structures completed in 1906
Buildings and structures in Stockton, California
National Register of Historic Places in San Joaquin County, California
Chicago school architecture in California
1906 establishments in California